Prudencio Sánchez Fernández, commonly known as Pruden (1 September 1916 – 25 February 1998) was a Spanish association football player who played mainly for Real Madrid.
His career started in Salamanca, in the club's first ever season, 1934–35 regional league. The next season, 1939–40 (after the Spanish Civil War), the club was promoted to Segunda División, the second tier in Spain. He then moved to Atlético Madrid, where he scored 33 goals winning the Pichichi Trophy and helping the club win the La Liga title. He then returned to his youth club for 2 years, and after failing to lead the club to promotion, he left for Real Madrid. He spent 5 years in Madrid, failing to win the league title, although he did win two consecutive Copa del Rey, in 1946 and 1947, and scored in both finals. He finished his professional career with one season in Real Zaragoza, in the Tercera División, then the 3rd tier.

Notes

External links
 
Resumen 1945-46

1916 births
Spanish footballers
Atlético Madrid footballers
Pichichi Trophy winners
1998 deaths
Association football forwards
Real Madrid CF players
UD Salamanca players
La Liga players
Real Zaragoza players
Segunda División players
Sportspeople from Salamanca
Tercera División players